Ikechi 'Chi Chi' Ariguzo is an American football linebacker who is currently a free agent. He played college football at Northwestern University. He signed with the Chargers as an undrafted free agent in 2015.

Professional career

San Diego Chargers
After going unselected in the 2015 NFL Draft, Ariguzo signed with the San Diego Chargers on May 3, 2015. On September 5, 2015, he was waived. On March 3, 2016, Ariguzo was released.

Detroit Lions
On August 5, 2016, Ariguzo signed with the Detroit Lions. On September 1, 2016, Ariguzo was waived by the Lions.

References

External links
San Diego Chargers bio

Living people
American football linebackers
San Diego Chargers players
Detroit Lions players
Northwestern Wildcats football players
1992 births